Country calling codes, country dial-in codes, or international subscriber dialing (ISD) codes are telephone number prefixes for reaching telephone subscribers in foreign countries or areas via international telecommunication networks. Country codes are defined by the  International Telecommunication Union (ITU) in ITU-T standards E.123 and E.164. The prefixes enable international direct dialing (IDD).

Country codes are a component of the international telephone numbering plan and are necessary only when dialing a telephone number to establish a call to another country. Country codes are dialed before the national telephone number. The ITU standard specifies that an international telephone number is represented by prefixing it with a plus sign (+), which indicates to the subscriber that the local international call prefix must be dialed first. For example, the International direct dialing prefix in all countries of the North American Numbering Plan is 011, while it is 00 in most European, Asian and African countries. On GSM (cellular) networks, the IDD prefix may automatically be inserted by the network operator when the user prefixes a dialed number with the plus sign.

Overview
The first column contains the initial digits of the code shared by each country in each row, arranged in columns for the last digit. When three-digit codes share a common leading pair, the two-digit code is unassigned, being ambiguous (denoted by "ambig."). Unassigned codes are denoted by a dash (—). Countries are identified by ISO 3166-1 alpha-2 country codes; codes for non-geographic services are denoted by two asterisks (**).

Ordered by world zone
World zones are organized principally, but only approximately, by geographic location. Exceptions exist for political and historical alignments.

Zone 1: North American Numbering Plan (NANP)

NANP members are assigned three-digit numbering plan area (NPA) codes under the common country prefix 1, shown in the format 1 (NPA).

1 North American Numbering Plan
 1 – , including United States territories:
 1 (340) – 
 1 (670) – 
 1 (671) – 
 1 (684) – 
 1 (787, 939) – 
 1 – 
 Caribbean nations, Dutch and British Overseas Territories:
 1 (242) – 
 1 (246) – 
 1 (264) – 
 1 (268) – 
 1 (284) – 
 1 (345) – 
 1 (441) – 
 1 (473) – 
 1 (649) – 
 1 (658, 876) – 
 1 (664) – 
 1 (721) – 
 1 (758) – 
 1 (767) – 
 1 (784) – 
 1 (809, 829, 849) – 
 1 (868) – 
 1 (869) –

Zone 2: Mostly Africa
(but also Aruba, Faroe Islands, Greenland and British Indian Ocean Territory)
 20 – 
 210 – unassigned
 211 – 
 212 –  (including Western Sahara)
 213 – 
 214 – unassigned
 215 – unassigned
 216 – 
 217 – unassigned
 218 – 
 219 – unassigned
 220 – 
 221 – 
 222 – 
 223 – 
 224 – 
 225 – 
 226 – 
 227 – 
 228 – 
 229 – 
 230 – 
 231 – 
 232 – 
 233 – 
 234 – 
 235 – 
 236 – 
 237 – 
 238 – 
 239 – 
 240 – 
 241 – 
 242 – 
 243 – 
 244 – 
 245 – 
 246 – 
 247 – 
 248 – 
 249 – 
 250 – 
 251 – 
 252 – 
 253 – 
 254 – 
 255 – 
 255 24 – , in place of never-implemented 259
 256 – 
 257 – 
 258 – 
 259 – unassigned (was intended for People's Republic of Zanzibar but never implemented – see 255 Tanzania)
 260 – 
 261 – 
 262 – 
 262 269 / 639 –  (formerly at 269 Comoros)
 263 – 
 264 –  (formerly 27 6x as South West Africa)
 265 – 
 266 – 
 267 – 
 268 – 
 269 –  (formerly assigned to Mayotte, now at 262)
 27 – 
 28x – unassigned (reserved for country code expansion)
 290 – 
 290 8 – 
 291 – 
 292 – unassigned
 293 – unassigned
 294 – unassigned
 295 – unassigned (formerly assigned to San Marino, now at 378)
 296 – unassigned
 297 – 
 298 – 
 299 –

Zones 3–4: Europe

Some of the larger countries were assigned two-digit codes to compensate for their usually longer domestic numbers. Small countries were assigned three-digit codes, which also has been the practice since the 1980s.
 30 – 
 31 – 
 32 – 
 33 – 
 34 – 
 350 – 
 351 – 
 351 291 –  (landlines only)
 351 292 –  (landlines only, Horta, Azores area)
 351 295 –  (landlines only, Angra do Heroísmo area)
 351 296 –  (landlines only, Ponta Delgada and São Miguel Island area)
 352 – 
 353 – 
 354 – 
 355 – 
 356 – 
 357 –  (including )
 358 – 
 358 18 – 
 359 – 
 36 –  (formerly assigned to Turkey, now at 90)
 37 – unassigned (formerly assigned to East Germany until its reunification with West Germany, now part of 49 Germany)
 370 –  (formerly 7 012 as Lithuanian SSR)
 371 –  (formerly 7 013 as Latvian SSR)
 372 –  (formerly 7 014 as Estonian SSR)
 373 –  (formerly 7 042 as Moldavian SSR)
 374 –  (formerly 7 885 as Armenian SSR)
 374 47 –  (landlines, formerly 7 893)
 374 97 –  (mobile phones)
 375 – 
376 –  (formerly 33 628)
 377 –  (formerly 33 93)
 378 –  (interchangeably with 39 549; earlier was allocated 295 but never used)
379 –  (assigned but uses 39 06698).
 38 – unassigned (formerly assigned to Yugoslavia until its break-up in 1991)
 380 – 
 381 – 
 382 – 
 383 – 
 384 – unassigned
 385 – 
 386 – 
 387 – 
 388 – unassigned (formerly assigned to the European Telephony Numbering Space)
 389 – 
 39 – 
 39 06 698 –  (assigned 379 but not in use)
 39 0549 –  (interchangeably with 378)
 40 – 
 41 – 
 41 91 –  Campione d'Italia, an Italian enclave
 42 – unassigned (formerly assigned to Czechoslovakia until its breakup in 1993)
 420 – 
 421 – 
 422 – unassigned
 423 –  (formerly 41 75)
 424 – unassigned
 425 – unassigned
 426 – unassigned
 427 – unassigned
 428 – unassigned
 429 – unassigned
 43 – 
 44 – 
 44 1481 – 
 44 1534 – 
 44 1624 – 
 45 – 
 46 – 
 47 – 
 47 79 – 
 48 – 
 49 –

Zone 5: South and Central Americas
 500 – 
 500 x – 
 501 – 
 502 – 
 503 – 
 504 – 
 505 – 
 506 – 
 507 – 
 508 – 
 509 – 
 51 – 
 52 – 
 53 – 
 54 – 
 55 – 
 56 – 
 57 – 
 58 – 
 590 –  (including Saint Barthélemy, Saint Martin)
 591 – 
 592 – 
 593 – 
 594 – 
 595 – 
 596 –  (formerly assigned to Peru, now at 51)
 597 – 
 598 – 
 599 – Former , now grouped as follows:
 599 3 – 
 599 4 – 
 599 5 – unassigned (formerly assigned to Sint Maarten, now included in NANP as 1 721)
 599 7 – 
 599 8 – unassigned (formerly assigned to Aruba, now at 297)
 599 9 –

Zone 6: Southeast Asia and Oceania
 60 – 
 61 –  (see also 672 below)
 61 8 9162 – 
 61 8 9164 – 
 62 – 
 63 – 
 64 – 
 64 xx – 
 65 – 
 66 – 
 670 –  (formerly 62 39 during the Indonesian occupation); formerly assigned to Northern Mariana Islands, now included in NANP as 1-670 (See Zone 1, above)
 671 – unassigned (formerly assigned to Guam, now included in NANP as 1 671)
 672 – Australian External Territories (see also 61 Australia above); formerly assigned to Portuguese Timor (see 670)
 672 1x –  Australian Antarctic Territory
 672 3 – 
 673 – 
 674 – 
 675 – 
 676 – 
 677 – 
 678 – 
 679 – 
 680 – 
 681 – 
 682 – 
 683 – 
 684 – unassigned (formerly assigned to American Samoa, now included in NANP as 1 684)
 685 – 
 686 – 
 687 – 
 688 – 
 689 – 
 690 – 
 691 – 
 692 – 
 693 – unassigned
 694 – unassigned
 695 – unassigned
 696 – unassigned
 697 – unassigned
 698 – unassigned
 699 – unassigned

Zone 7: Russia and neighboring regions 
 7 –  (formerly assigned to the Soviet Union until its dissolution in 1991)
 7 (840, 940) –  (ITU code: 995 (44))
 7 (850, 929) –  (ITU code: 995 (34))

Zone 8: East Asia and special services
 800 – Universal International Freephone Service (UIFN)
 801 – unassigned
 802 – unassigned
 803 – unassigned
 804 – unassigned
 805 – unassigned
 806 – unassigned
 807 – unassigned
 808 – Universal International Shared Cost Service (UISC)
 809 – unassigned
 81 – 
 82 – 
 83x – unassigned (reserved for country code expansion)
 84 – 
 850 – 
 851 – unassigned
 852 – 
 853 – 
 854 – unassigned
 855 – 
 856 – 
 857 – unassigned (formerly ANAC satellite service)
 858 – unassigned (formerly ANAC satellite service)
 859 – unassigned
 86 – 
 870 – Inmarsat 
 871 – unassigned (formerly assigned to Inmarsat Atlantic East, discontinued in 2008)
 872 – unassigned (formerly assigned to Inmarsat Pacific, discontinued in 2008)
 873 – unassigned (formerly assigned to Inmarsat Indian, discontinued in 2008)
 874 – unassigned (formerly assigned to Inmarsat Atlantic West, discontinued in 2008)
 875 – unassigned (reserved for future maritime mobile service)
 876 – unassigned (reserved for future maritime mobile service)
 877 – unassigned (reserved for future maritime mobile service)
 878 – unassigned (formerly assigned to Universal Personal Telecommunications Service, discontinued in 2022)
 879 – unassigned (reserved for national non-commercial purposes)
 880 – 
 881 – Global Mobile Satellite System
 882 – International Networks
 883 – International Networks
 884 – unassigned
 885 – unassigned
 886 – 
 887 – unassigned
 888 – unassigned (formerly assigned to OCHA for Telecommunications for Disaster Relief service)
 889 – unassigned
 89x – unassigned (reserved for country code expansion)

Zone 9: Mostly Middle East, Central Asia and parts of southern Asia
 90 – 
 90 (392) – 
 91 – 
 92 – 
 92 (581) – 
 92 (582) – 
 93 – 
 94 – 
 95 – 
 960 – 
 961 – 
 962 – 
 963 – 
 964 – 
 965 – 
 966 – 
 967 – 
 968 – 
 969 – unassigned (formerly assigned to South Yemen until its unification with North Yemen, now part of 967 Yemen)
 970 – 
 971 – 
 972 – 
 973 – 
 974 – 
 975 – 
 976 – 
 977 – 
 978 – unassigned (formerly assigned to Dubai, now part of 971 United Arab Emirates)
 979 – Universal International Premium Rate Service (UIPRS); (formerly assigned to Abu Dhabi, now part of 971 United Arab Emirates)
 98 – 
 990 – unassigned
 991 – International Telecommunications Public Correspondence Service trial (ITPCS)
 992 – 
 993 – 
 994 – 
 995 – 
 995 (34) –  (ITU country code, also via Russia 7 (850, 929))
 995 (44) –  (ITU country code, also via Russia 7 (840, 940)
 996 – 
 997 –  (in permissive dialling period until 2026, with previous routing of 7 (6xx, 7xx))
 998 – 
 999 – unassigned (reserved for future global service)

Alphabetical order

Locations with no country code
In Antarctica, telecommunication services are provided by the parent country of each base:

Other places with no country codes in use, although a code may be reserved:

See also

 List of mobile telephone prefixes by country
 National conventions for writing telephone numbers

Notes

References

External links

 
 
 
 
 

Communication-related lists
International telecommunications
Lists of country codes

Telecommunications lists